Djordje Petrović (born 8 October 1999) is a Serbian professional footballer who plays as a goalkeeper for the New England Revolution in Major League Soccer and the Serbia national football team.

Club career

FK Čukarički
Petrović was part of the FK Čukarički academy from 2014, going on to break in to the Serbian SuperLiga club's first team in 2019, following a loan to Serbian League club FK IMT for the 2018–19 season. Petrović made 78 league appearances for Čukarički, as well as four Serbian Cup appearances, and four UEFA Europa Conference League appearances.

New England Revolution
On 6 April 2022, Petrović  signed with Major League Soccer club New England Revolution on a three-year deal for an undisclosed fee.

Petrović recorded his first clean sheet for his new club on June 26, 2022. Recording six saves in a 0-0 draw away at BC Place against the Vancouver Whitecaps. His efforts earned him a spot on the week 16 MLS Team of the Week.

International career
Petrović was called up to the Serbia U21 side in 2020, making a single appearance against Poland. He made his senior debut for the Serbia national football team on 25 January 2021, starting in a 0–0 draw with the Dominican Republic.

Career statistics

International

References

External links
 

1999 births
Living people
Association football goalkeepers
FK Čukarički players
Expatriate soccer players in the United States
Major League Soccer players
MLS Next Pro players
New England Revolution players
New England Revolution II players
Serbian expatriate footballers
Serbian expatriate sportspeople in the United States
Serbian footballers
Serbia international footballers
Serbia under-21 international footballers
Serbian SuperLiga players
Sportspeople from Požarevac